Laurence Joseph Belcher (born 27 December 1995) is an English actor, best known for his roles as Young Kazran in Doctor Who and as Young Charles Xavier in X-Men: First Class. He also starred as Maurice  Dumont in The Shadow Within and Gracie!. After attending City of London Freemen's School in Ashtead, Surrey, he studied Classical Archaeology and Ancient History at the University of Oxford, completing his degree in 2018.

Career
Belcher made his film debut as Maurice Dumont in horror/thriller The Shadow Within and went on to star in Messengers 2 and X-Men: First Class. He also had a major part in Doctor Who episode "A Christmas Carol", based on A Christmas Carol by Charles Dickens, as the 12-year-old Kazran. Some of his other appearances have been alongside Ashley Judd and Sean Bean in ABC drama 'Missing', released in early 2012. Laurence made his theatre debut in Alan Bennet's The Habit of Art at the National Theatre alongside Richard Griffiths and Alex Jennings in 2010, the end of which was overlapped by rehearsals for Simon Gray's The Late Middle Classes at the Donmar Warehouse, directed by David Leveaux, and starring Helen McCrory and Robert Glenister. In 2013, he appeared in "The Turn of the Screw" at the Almeida theatre. In 2022, he appeared in To Kill a Mockingbird at the Gielgud Theatre.

Filmography

References

External links

1995 births
Living people
English male child actors
English male film actors
English male television actors
People from Surrey
21st-century English male actors
Alumni of the University of Oxford